Nikolai Alekseevich Naydyonov (9 November 1918 — 10 February 1993) was a Soviet flying ace during World War II. Awarded the title Hero of the Soviet Union on 24 August 1943 for his initial victories, by the end of the war his tally stood at an estimated 18 solo and four shared shootdowns.

References 

1918 births
1993 deaths
Soviet World War II flying aces
Heroes of the Soviet Union
Recipients of the Order of Lenin
Recipients of the Order of the Red Banner
Recipients of the Order of Alexander Nevsky